Sceliphron deforme is a species of thread-waisted wasp in the family Sphecidae. It is found in Europe.

The MONA or Hodges number for Sceliphron deforme is 8801.

Subspecies
These five subspecies belong to the species Sceliphron deforme:
 Sceliphron deforme atripes (F. Morawitz, 1888)
 Sceliphron deforme deforme (F. Smith, 1856)
 Sceliphron deforme femorale Hensen, 1987
 Sceliphron deforme nipponicum Tsuneki, 1972
 Sceliphron deforme tibiale Cameron, 1899

References

Sphecidae
Articles created by Qbugbot
Insects described in 1856